Lakeer – Forbidden Lines is a 2004 Indian Hindi-language romantic action film directed by Ahmed Khan,stars an ensemble cast of  Sunny Deol, Sunil Shetty, John Abraham,  Sohail Khan and Nauheed Cyrusi. The music was by A. R. Rahman with cinematography by Johny Lal. The film released on 14 May 2004.

Plot
Karan Rana (Sohail Khan) and Bindiya (Nauheed Cyrusi) are childhood friends and live with Karan's brother Arjun Rana (Sunny Deol). Karan's feelings for Bindiya are more than just of a friend; however, she is unaware of his feelings and falls in love with a sweet boy named Saahil (John Abraham) gradually. 

One day, Karan sees the love letter by Saahil and then tears it apart. His friend Rony (Apoorva Agnihotri) humiliates Saahil about falling in love with Bindiya and being so poor. Saahil gets angry and tries to kill himself. However, when Saahil's brother Sanju (Sunil Shetty), who is a car mechanic, finds him unconscious and badly wounded, he cannot control his anger and goes looking for Rony. However, when Sanju gets to the college, he sees Karan sitting down, wearing Rony's jacket with his name on the back, and starts beating him up in public. Karan is hospitalised when Sanju finds out that he has beaten Karan and not Rony. Arjun, a very powerful and wealthy gangster, wants to avenge Sanju for badly beating up his brother. However, Arjun is unaware of Bindiya's feelings for Saahil and Karan's for Bindiya. Saahil advises Sanju to give up his violent ways. Sanju hands himself to Arjun and gets badly beaten up by his men. Saahil apologizes to Sanju and decides to leave Bindiya.

One month later, Saahil starts working in a cafe. Bindiya tries to meet Saahil every day, but he escapes every time, but soon, Bindiya and Saahil fall in love again. Sanju also approves of her. Meanwhile, Karan returns from the hospital and decides to meet Arjun and tell him about his love. Arjun is happy to know that Karan is in love with Bindiya. That night, Rony challenges Saahil for a fight. Saahil beats up Rony brutally.

Meanwhile, Karan proposes to Bindiya. She tells him that she considers Karan as a best friend but loves Saahil. Karan becomes furious. After beating Rony, Saahil takes his gun to kill Karan. Sanju enters Arjun's bungalow to tell Arjun about Karan's reality. He beats up all his goons. Arjun cannot control his anger and starts beating up Sanju. Rony then comes to Sanju's aid and confirms the truth about Karan to Arjun. Karan's love turns into a deadly obsession, and he forces Bindiya to marry him on the spot. Saahil then reaches there, and eventually, a dangerous fight ensues between Saahil and Karan. Karan hits Saahil repeatedly with an iron rod in the face and knocks him unconscious. Arjun comes there to rescue Bindiya and talk to Karan. Karan shoots Sanju's arm, while Saahil regains consciousness. Karan is just about to shoot Bindiya and Saahil, but Bindiya tells Karan that she hates him because of his actions. Arjun shoots Karan with tears in his eyes, whilst the latter dies on the spot. Arjun takes Karan's body to the church and is heartbroken and guilt-ridden that he did not wanted to kill his brother, despite he was wrong. Saahil, Bindiya and Sanju apologise to and pacify Arjun, saying that he was not wrong but Karan was.

Cast
Sunny Deol as Arjun Rana, Karan's elder brother.
Suniel Shetty as Sanjay "Sanju" Mishra, Saahil's elder brother.  
John Abraham as Saahil Mishra, Sanju's younger brother.        
Sohail Khan as Karan Rana, Arjun's younger brother. 
Apoorva Agnihotri as Ronny D'Souza
Nauheed Cyrusi as Bindiya
Vrajesh Hirjee as Brij Khanna, Saahil's friend.
Hemant Birje as Anees Ghanchi, Arjun's bodyguard.
Raj Zutshi as Montu, Sanju's friend.
Avtar Gill as Gani Chacha
Razak Khan as Javed Hashmi aka Pilot
Vishwajeet Pradhan as Police Inspector Kadam
Suresh Chatwal
Dhananjay Mandrekar as Shetty, Arjun's bodyguard.
Rana Jung Bahadur as Sachin

Soundtrack

The songs were composed by A. R. Rahman.

Rahman reused three classic songs he composed for the Tamil film Rhythm, with only four new songs added due to lack of time. The songs of Rhythm were inspired from the 5 elements of the world. Rahman did not do the background score, since he was busily involved in several other projects. Lakeer is thus Rahman's only film to not feature him as score composer, as he was only a guest song composer for the 2018 film Sanju.

Reception

NowRunning gave it a 2 out of 5 and said "Regrettably the scriptwriter goes back to every mafia movie you've seen from Scarface to Vaastav to Gang without bothering to put a fresh spin into the genre". Planet Bollywood gave it  7 out of 10 praising everyone's performances but criticised Sunny Deol getting overshadowed in the second half.

References

External links
 

2004 films
2000s Hindi-language films
Films scored by A. R. Rahman
Indian gangster films
Indian action drama films
Indian romantic drama films
Indian romantic action films
2000s action drama films
2000s romantic action films
2004 romantic drama films
Films directed by Ahmed Khan